Giovanni Battista de Asti, O.S.A. (1566–1620) was a Roman Catholic prelate who served as Titular Bishop of Thagaste (1620).

Biography
Giovanni Battista de Asti was born in Albenga, Italy in 1566 and ordained a priest in the Order of Saint Augustine.
On 18 May 1620, he was appointed during the papacy of Pope Paul V as Titular Bishop of Thagaste.
On 31 May 1620, he was consecrated bishop by Giovanni Garzia Mellini, Cardinal-Priest of Santi Quattro Coronati, with Vincenzo Landinelli, Bishop of Albenga, and Nicolò Spínola, Bishop of Ventimiglia, serving as co-consecrators. 
He served as Titular Bishop of Thagaste until his death on 20 September 1620.

References 

17th-century Roman Catholic titular bishops
Bishops appointed by Pope Paul V
1566 births
1620 deaths
Augustinian bishops